American Bellydancer is a 2005 documentary film directed by Jonathan Brandeis. It features Bellydancers including Ansuya, Rachel Galoob-Ortega, Suhaila Salimpour, Rachel Brice and Sonia.

References

External links
 
 

2005 films
American documentary films
Belly dance
2000s English-language films
2005 documentary films
2000s American films